The discography of The Greenhornes, an American rock band, consists of four studio albums, one EP, five singles, one album of demos, and a compilation album.

Studio albums

Demos/outtakes albums

Compilation albums

Extended plays

Singles

References

Discographies of American artists
Rock music group discographies